Gymnophryxe claripennis is a Nearctic species of tachinid flies in the genus Gymnophryxe of the family Tachinidae.

Distribution
United States, Canada.

References

Diptera of North America
Exoristinae
Insects described in 1943